The Reuters Institute for the Study of Journalism (RISJ) is a UK-based research centre and think tank founded in 2006, which operates Thomson Reuters Journalism Fellowship Programme, also known as the Reuters Fellowship.

History
The institute was founded in the Department of Politics and International Relations at the University of Oxford in 2006 to conduct scholarly and professional research on news media, operate the Thomson Reuters Journalism Fellowship Programme, and host academic research fellows. The RISJ works to bridge daily working journalism and academic study. The Institute regularly holds seminars and events and has an extensive publication programme.

Description
The Reuters Institute is the University of Oxford's research centre on issues affecting news media globally.

Fellowship programme
The Thomson Reuters Journalism Fellowship Programme, or Reuters Fellowship, founded in 1983, is jointly based at the University of Oxford's Department of Politics and International Relations and Green Templeton College. It has hosted over 600 fellows from 90 countries. The fellowship is open to selected mid-career journalists from all over the world, who are funded to produce an academic paper on topics of their choice at Oxford.

RISJ also hosts a limited number academic fellows working on funded research projects on issues of significance to the news industry. Its central interests include journalism practices, standards, accountability, media policy, and the business of news.

Funding and governance

The Reuters Institute receives core funding from the Thomson Reuters Foundation and additional funding from media companies, foundations, and science academies worldwide.

 the institute's staff includes Rasmus Kleis Nielsen as director, and Meera Selva as deputy director and director of the Journalist Fellowship Programme.

The institute's steering committee is chaired by Alan Rusbridger, former editor-in-chief of The Guardian, and former principal of Lady Margaret Hall. Advisory board members include Marty Baron, executive editor, The Washington Post; Ritu Kapur, co-founder and CEO, The Quint, India; and Baroness Wheatcroft of Blackheath.

The RISJ is a partner of the European Journalism Observatory, a network of eleven language sites reporting media research from across Europe.

Publications
Each year, the RISJ publishes predictive reports on trends in the news industry. It also publishes an annual digital news report.

Event

History 
 Nirvana El-Abd, Presenter Bein Sports channel from Qatar, Best presenter in Middle East for World

References

External links

Departments of the University of Oxford
Research institutes established in 2006
United Kingdom journalism organisations
Journalism standards
Journalism ethics
Think tanks based in the United Kingdom
2006 establishments in the United Kingdom
Think tanks established in 2006
Journalism fellowships